Aziz Hayat, known by his stage name Jaz (born March 5, 1993) is an Bruneian-born Indonesian singer. He released a single titled Dari Mata in 2016 which was well received in the Indonesian music industry.

Life and career

1993–2013: Early life and early career 
Born in Brunei on March 5, 1993, with the name Aziz Hayat. Jaz was raised by his grandmother since the age of one. When Jaz was one year old, his parents divorced. After separating, his mother decided not to remarry. Meanwhile, the father now has a wife from Bogor, West Java, and lives in Brunei. Jaz was then raised by his grandmother. Raised since childhood makes Jaz consider his grandmother as his own parents. Jaz dreams of becoming a singer, but his grandmother forbids his beloved grandson to pursue singing.

Before seriously pursuing music, Jaz himself really wanted to be a soccer player. In the past, Jaz was even serious about pursuing football until he joined the Brunei Darussalam U-16 National Team and had participated in a tournament in Thailand in 2007. Football was indeed the world he focused on as a teenager. Because of his love for the sport, Jaz is very diligent in practicing, so that he can become a professional soccer athlete. While the world of music, at that time he still considered it as entertainment. Until finally, he got to know R&B music and changed his dream.

Jaz's career began as a singer at weddings. He is also actively writing and recording songs. One of his songs, I Stalk Your Profile, was distributed by Jaz through the video sharing site YouTube. Thanks to the video, Jaz was asked to appear at Anugerah Planet Muzik (APM) in 2013. APM is an award ceremony for musicians in Malay countries such as Indonesia, Singapore, Malaysia, and Brunei.

His performance at APM made Jazz's singing talent known to the public. Record company  then recruited him. Got a record deal, Jaz is happy. But that happiness was disturbed by sad news. Jaz's grandmother died shortly after his appearance on APM. After his grandmother died, Jaz was giddy. He was confused about what to do. Jaz's enthusiasm to become a singer suddenly stopped. But life must go on, Jaz decided to move to Jakarta and continue his dream of becoming a singer. Jaz tries to be an independent person and does not depend on others.

2014–2016: Single From Dari Mata 
In 2016, Jaz released his first single entitled Dari Mata. From Mata's success in the market, this song has topped the charts on several streaming music services in Indonesia such as Joox and Spotify. The process of creating this song from idea to production is not instant. It took Jaz 4 months to complete the material. In terms of lyrics to the basic melody of the song is his creation.

2017–present:  Kasmaran single and debut album project 
In early 2017, Jaz released his second single entitled Kasmaran. Just like his first single, Kasmaran was successful in the Indonesian music industry. Before this year changed, Jaz apparently didn't want to be satisfied with just two singles, Dari Mata and Kasmaran. He plans to release a third single first before releasing an album. In a chat with detikHOT, Jaz shared a number of plans he has for the next year. Starting from releasing the next single to the album next year. Although the plan was in sight, Jaz admitted that he was still choosing which song he would later line up as his third single. Jaz said the song will be chosen from 10 songs that are the material for the album.

Single

Filmography

Web series

References 

1993 births
Living people
Bruneian male singers
Indonesian male singers
Indonesian people of Malay descent
Bruneian emigrants to Indonesia